Edward Shellim (c. 1869 – 7 December 1928) was an English Jewish businessman in Hong Kong.

Biography
Born in Sussex, England to Ezekiel Shellim and Rebecca Sassoon, daughter of David Sassoon, he joined his grandfather's firm David Sassoon & Co., one of the oldest trading houses in Hong Kong, and was the manager of the Hong Kong branch of the firm. He was also chairman of the Hongkong and Shanghai Banking Corporation in 1908 and 1912 and served as director of the bank for many years, director of the Hong Kong Tramways, the Hong Kong Land Investment & Agency Co., the Hong Kong Land Reclamation Co., the Central Estates, the Hong Kong & Kowloon Wharf & Godown Co. and member of the consulting committee of the China Sugar Refining Co., the Hong Kong Fire Insurance Co. and the Canton Insurance Office.

He was member of the Shanghai Municipal Council in 1898 and member of the Shanghai Chamber of Commerce. During his residence in Hong Kong, he was made Justice of Peace and appointed an unofficial member of the Legislative Council of Hong Kong from 1913 to 1918. He was also elected member of the Licensing Board. He served on the committee of the Hong Kong General Chamber of Commerce and the Sailors' Home and was the chairman of the financial committee of the Alice Memorial Hospital, president of the Ohel Leah Synagogue and member of the Court of the University of Hong Kong.

Shellim retired in 1918 from the manager of the David Sassoon & Co. and succeeded by A. H. Compton. He lived in Shanghai for a short period of time after retirement and then settled in England.

He died on 7 December 1928 while riding his horse at Devil's Dyke, Brighton at the age of 59 and left Hong Kong estate worth $539,100 and England £53,165. He married Miss Howard, the daughter of another former manager of the firm and had a daughter named Luna Eryl Valerie.

References

1869 births
1928 deaths
Hong Kong businesspeople
English businesspeople
Hong Kong Jews
English Jews
Hongkong Land
Chairmen of HSBC
Members of the Legislative Council of Hong Kong
People from Sussex
English emigrants to Hong Kong
Sassoon family